Wisconsin Bell, Inc. (known as Wisconsin Telephone Co. before 1984) is the name of the Bell Operating Company serving Wisconsin. It is owned by AT&T through AT&T Teleholdings, originally known as Ameritech.

Their headquarters is at 722 North Broadway, Milwaukee, WI. After the 1984 Bell System Divestiture, Wisconsin Bell became a part of Ameritech, one of the 7 original Bell Regional Holding Companies.

In 1985, Wisconsin Bell began to purchase digital switching equipment from Siemens for its 1.6 million customers. In 1989, the change had been completed, and it became the first Ameritech company to use solely electronic switching equipment.

The Wisconsin Bell name continued to be used until September 1993 when Ameritech dropped all of their individual Bell Operating Company names in favor of using their corporate name for marketing purposes. Wisconsin Bell started doing business as Ameritech Wisconsin.

In 1998, Ameritech sold 19 Wisconsin Bell exchanges, primarily located in central and northern Wisconsin, to CenturyTel, now CenturyLink. Those exchanges were transferred to CenturyLink's subsidiary CenturyTel of the Midwest-Kendall.

In 2001, Wisconsin Bell began doing business as SBC Ameritech Wisconsin. In 2002, it began doing business as SBC Wisconsin. In 2005, it adopted the trade name AT&T Wisconsin and continues to do business as such to this day. Its corporate name has remained the same.

After being held by AT&T (pre-1984), Ameritech, and SBC, as of 2005, they are now part of the "new" AT&T.

AT&T Center 
The AT&T Center is a 19-story, 213 foot tall neo-gothic building in downtown Milwaukee, Wisconsin. Construction began in 1918 for Wisconsin Telephone Company and was completed in 1924. It currently houses the AT&T Wisconsin headquarters.

References

See also 
AT&T
Ameritech
Ameritech Cellular
Bell System
CenturyTel of the Midwest-Kendall

AT&T subsidiaries
Bell System
Telecommunications companies established in 1882
Telecommunications companies of the United States
Communications in Wisconsin
Companies based in Milwaukee
Defunct telecommunications companies of the United States
Skyscraper office buildings in Milwaukee
AT&T buildings
Office buildings completed in 1924